General Motors 50th Anniversary Show is a 1957 television special, broadcast live and in color on NBC-TV, directed by Charles S. Dubin, produced by Jess Oppenheimer, and written by Helen Deutsch.

Plot
A celebration including drama, comedy and music highlights included, Pat Boone singing "Where Are You?" in a skit called the Sad Lover in a Mardi Gras scene. A comedy sketch with Eddie Bracken and Hans Conried called "Poor Charlie: the Book Store". Including Alice Ghostley and Dennis Joel and Tirrell Barbery as Ethel and Andy and Julie. Dan Dailey, Carol Burnett, Steve Lawrence and Chita Rivera in a comedy song and dance titled, "Past and Future". "Mr. Boland's Afternoon", a dramatic sketch with Don Ameche and Peg Lynch. "Firsts" a comedy sketch with Claudette Colbert and Kent Smith. "The Bridge" a dramatic/musical endeavor with Cyril Ritchard and Claudia Crawford. Dean Martin, Howard Keel, Doretta Morrow and Bambi Linn in a potpourri of songs about Love.

Background and reception
General Motors announced in June 1957 that it had commissioned the NBC network to produce a two-hour musical celebration of its 50th anniversary.
It was the most viewed television show in the United States for the two-week period ending November 23, 1957, according to the Nielsen ratings, with a 49.4% audience share, and 19,858,000 homes tuned in.  Jack Gould of The New York Times reviewed the show positively, calling it a "superb musical production, rewardingly experimental in approach, delightfully humorous and touchingly poignant.  It was artistic television of a high order."

The special was nominated for an Emmy for Primetime Emmy Award for Program of the Year, which was won that year by The Comedian (Playhouse 90), and was also nominated for Best Live Camera Work.

An album was released on RCA Victor containing performances from the special.

Cast
June Allyson ... Emily Webb (in "Our Town")
Don Ameche ...  Henry Sylvester Bowdoin
Pat Boone ...  Young Man at the Mardi Gras
Ernest Borgnine ...  Himself - Narrator
Eddie Bracken ...  Charlie Smith
Carol Burnett ...  Ruth Swanson
Claudette Colbert ...  Mrs. Harry Collier
Hans Conried ...  Bookseller
Claudia Crawford ...  Melinda
Jacques d'Amboise ...  Himself
Dan Dailey ...  Bill
Kirk Douglas ...  Himself - Host/Narrator
John Fiedler ... Milkman (in "Our Town")
Alice Ghostley ... Ethel Smith
John Gibson ... Mr. Webb (in "Our Town")
Helen Hayes ...  Herself
Dennis Olivieri ...  Andy Smith
Howard Keel ...  Himself
Steve Lawrence ...  Tom
Lynn Loring ... Judy Collier
Bambi Linn ...  Herself
Peg Lynch ...  Mrs. Henry Sylvester Bowdoin
Carmen Mathews ...  Myrtle Webb (in "Our Town")
Doretta Morrow ...  Herself
Cyril Ritchard ...  Orlando B. Courtwright
Chita Rivera ...  South Seas Island Dream Girl
Louis Scholle ... Dick Collier
Dinah Shore ...  Herself
Kent Smith ...  Harry Collier
Tirrell Barbery ... Julia

Filming locations
New York City, New York, USA
Cast:Peg Lynch..herself

References

External links
 

American television films
1957 television films
1950s English-language films
Films directed by Charles S. Dubin